Robert Keiter (born 1946) is an American lawyer, currently the Wallace Stegner Professor of Law and Distinguished Professor at S. J. Quinney College of Law, University of Utah.

References

University of Utah faculty
American lawyers
1946 births
Living people